Jill Trappler (born July 1957 in Gauteng, Benoni, South Africa) is a South African artist who works in several media, including painting, weaving,  and installation.

Trappler's work is in various private, corporate, and public collections, including the National Museum of African Art, SANG, Vodacom, SABC, Investec, and Nandos UK. Trappler's work has been featured in several exhibitions including at the Association for Visual Arts Gallery in 2003, and the AVA Gallery in 2015, as well as on-line sites such as "Invaluable.com".

Trappler also trains aspiring artists in workshops such as the "Restructuring Two-dimensional Images" workshop at Kirstenbosch in 2019.

References

External links

1957 births
Living people
20th-century South African women artists
21st-century South African women artists
South African contemporary artists